Year 1100 (MC) was a leap year starting on Sunday (link will display the full calendar) of the Julian calendar, the 1100th year of the Common Era (CE) and Anno Domini (AD) designations, the 100th year of the 2nd millennium, the 100th and last year of the 11th century, and the 1st year of the 1100s decade. In the proleptic Gregorian calendar, it was a non-leap century year starting on Monday (like 1900).

Events 
 By place 

 Levant 
 January – The Seljuk ruler Mahmud I is expelled from Bagdad by his brother Barkiyaruq, but Mahmud manages to retake the city, during his spring offensive.
 May or June – Raymond IV (Saint-Gilles) sails to Constantinople to obtain the support of Emperor Alexios I (Komnenos), in his attempt to seize Tripoli.
 August 1 – A Genoese fleet leaves Italy, to support the Crusaders' efforts to conquer the coastal cities; the ships reach Latakia on  September 25.
 August – Battle of Melitene: Bohemond I is captured by the Danishmends, leaving Tancred as regent of the Principality of Antioch for two years.
 August 20 – With the support of the Venetian fleet, the Crusaders under Tancred capture the coastal city of Haifa.
 December 25 – Baldwin I is crowned first King of Jerusalem at the Church of the Nativity in Bethlehem, by Daimbert, the new Latin Patriarch of Jerusalem, following the death of the previous ruler, Baldwin's brother Godfrey of Bouillon, on July 18.
 After a success over the Armenians of Cilicia and the Emirate of Aleppo, Baldwin of Bourcq becomes Count of Edessa, with the support of Daimbert.
 Genoa, Venice and Pisa gain trading privileges from the Crusader states, in return for their service during the conquest of the coastal cities.

 Europe 
 August 2 – King William II (or William Rufus) dies in a hunting accident in the New Forest. Sir Walter Tirel is accused of having shot the arrow, but flees the country to avoid a trial. Henry I claims the throne.
 August 5 – Henry I is crowned King of England, at Westminster Abbey. The power of the new monarch is ill-assured, and to mollify the barons he has to grant them the Charter of Liberties, one of the first examples of a written constitution in Europe.
 August 30 – After the failure of the Council of Liubech in 1097, the Congress of Vytechev establishes peace and the feudal system in Kievan Rus; the princes come to an agreement to share the country between them. Sviatopolk II of Kiev becomes the first Grand Prince.
 September 16 – Battle of Malagon: The Almoravid army defeats the Castellan troops.
 September 23 – Anselm, archbishop of Canterbury returns from exile, at the invitation of Henry I.
 October 18 – Peter I of Aragon conquers Barbastro (modern Spain) from the hands of the Almoravids.
 November 11 – Henry I marries Matilda of Scotland, the daughter of King Malcolm III and a direct descendant of the Saxon king Edmund Ironside.
 Henry I grants the ownership of Carisbrooke Castle on the Isle of Wight to Richard de Redvers, a Norman nobleman.
 November 18 – The Council of Poitiers opens, but is soon forcibly closed by William IX, duke of Aquitaine, as the bishops were about to excommunicate King Philip I once more. 
 December 25 – Philip I elevates his son Louis VI as co-ruler to the government of the realm.
 In Iceland, the Althing decides that the laws should be transferred to a written form (approximate date).
 Intense urban activity in north and central Europe:  Kalmar (Kungälv) and Varberg (Sweden) are chartered; The cities of Aach (southern Germany) and Nakléřov in Bohemia are created. The castle of Burg Eppstein is built in central Germany.
 Philip I conquers the Vexin area, and adds the city of Bourges and the province of Berry to his estate.

 Africa 
 Tuareg traders establish the city of Timbuktu (modern Mali) north of Djenné along the Niger River. Timbuktu will later achieve fame as a center of Islamic learning. The Sankore, Djinguereber and Sidi Yahya mosques are among Timbuktu's most famous religious and scholarly institutions (approximate date).

 China 
 February 23 – Emperor Zhe Zong dies after a 15-year reign. He is succeeded by his 17-year-old brother Hui Zong as ruler of the Song Dynasty.
 In Kaifeng, capital of the Song Dynasty, is the number of registered citizens within the walls about 1,050,000. The army stationed there boosts the overall populace to some 1.4 million people.
 The Liao Dynasty crushes the Zubu, a tribute state of the Khitan Empire, and takes their khan prisoner.
 The Chinese population reaches about 100 million during the Song Dynasty (approximate date).

 Americas 
 Oraibi, a Hopi village in Navajo County, becomes the oldest populated settlement in modern-day Arizona (United States).
 The Ancestral Puebloans culture, located in the modern-day Four Corners (United States), rises (approximate date).
 The city of Cusco (modern Peru) is founded (approximate date).

 By topic 

 Religion 
 September 8 – Antipope Clement III dies at Civita Castellana after a 20-year reign in opposition to the legitimate popes Gregory VII, Victor III and Urban II.  Supporters of Emperor Henry IV in Rome choose Theodoric as his successor.
 November - The council of Poitiers decrees that the followers of Robert of Arbrissel have to settle down and live under a rule, leading to the foundation of Fontevraud Abbey.
 Frederick I becomes archbishop of Cologne, and begins the construction of the castle of Volmarstein.
 The Stift St. Georgen Abbey is founded near Sankt Georgen am Längsee (modern Austria).
 The Diocese of Faroe is founded (approximate date).

 Technology 
 Checkers is invented (approximate date).

Births 
 May 19 – Judith of Bavaria, duchess of Swabia (d. 1130)
 May 23 – Qin Zong, Chinese emperor (d. 1161)
 Achard of Saint Victor, Norman bishop (d. 1171)
 Adrian IV, pope of the Catholic Church (d. 1159)
 Albert I (the Bear), margrave of Brandenburg (d. 1170)
 Alexander III, pope of the Catholic Church (d. 1181)
 Anselm of Havelberg, German bishop (approximate date)
 Arnold I, archbishop of Cologne (approximate date)
 Bruno II of Berg, archbishop of Cologne (d. 1137)
 Eliza and Mary Chulkhurst, English conjoined twins (d. 1134)
 Elvira of Castile, queen of Sicily (approximate date)
 Gilbert de Clare, 1st Earl of Pembroke (d. 1148)
 Héloïse d'Argenteuil, French abbess and scholar (d. 1162)
 Herman of Carinthia, German astronomer (d. 1160)
 Hillin of Falmagne, archbishop of Trier (d. 1169)
 Jabir ibn Aflah, Arab astronomer and mathematician (d. 1150)
 John of Meda, Italian monk and abbot (d. 1159)
 Muhammad al-Idrisi, Almoravid geographer (d. 1165)
 Owain Gwynedd, king of Gwynedd (approximate date)
 Jacob ben Meir Tam, French Jewish rabbi (d. 1171)
 Robert de Beaumont, 2nd Earl Leicester (d. 1168)
 Robert de Ferrers, 2nd Earl of Derby (d. 1162)
 Robert of Melun, bishop of Hereford (d. 1167)
 Robert of Newminster, English abbot (d. 1159)
 Teobaldo Roggeri, Italian shoemaker (d. 1150)

Deaths 
 February 23 – Zhe Zong, Chinese emperor (b. 1077)
 February 25 – Gerland, bishop of Agrigento
 March 28 – Adelaide of Weimar-Orlamünde, German noblewoman
 July 18 – Godfrey of Bouillon, French nobleman (b. 1060)
 July 23 – Warner of Grez, French nobleman
 August 2 – William II (or William Rufus), king of England
 September 8 – Clement III, antipope of Rome
 September 16 – Bernold of Constance, German chronicler
 October 13 – Guy I (or Wido), French nobleman
 November 18 – Thomas of Bayeux, archbishop of York
 December 22 – Bretislav II, duke of Bohemia
 Abu al-Yusr al-Bazdawi, Hanafi-Maturidi scholar (b. 1030)
 Azzo of Gobatsburg, Swedish nobleman (approximate date)
 Geoffrey de Mandeville, Constable of the Tower
 Geoffrey the Elder, Italo-Norman nobleman
 Jaya Pala, Indian ruler of the Kamarupa Kingdom (b. 1075)
 Qin Guan, Chinese poet and writer (approximate date)
 Qutb al-din Hasan, ruler (malik) of the Ghurid Dynasty
 Robert de Stafford, Norman nobleman (approximate date)
 Lady Six Monkey, queen regnant of the Mixtec city State of Huachino (d. 1100)

References